Kher may refer to:

 Acacia senegal, a species of acacia
 Senegalia catechu, a species of thorny tree
 Kher, Rajasthan, a village in Barmer district, Rajasthan, India
 Kher (surname), an Indian surname (for persons with the name, see )
 Kher River, a tributary of the Gambhir River of Rajasthan, India

See also
 Khair, a city in Uttar Pradesh, India
 Khergarh (disambiguation)
 Ker (disambiguation)